Charles C Marto is an American producer and executive. He is the current president of VOLO Events.

Early life and career 
As a producer, Marto is the recipient of the primetime Emmy Award for his film, The Concert For World Children's Day.

As an executive, Marto has served as a chief executive officer of PlantGarden.

He is also the founder of VOLO Events.

References

American producers
Year of birth missing (living people)
Living people